Margaret Ann Loesch is an American television executive and producer. She is the former President and CEO of Discovery Communications and Hasbro Inc's joint venture television network Hub Network. On June 12, 2014, she announced that she would step down from her position sometime at the end of that year.

Early life
Margaret Ann Loesch was born to Margaret M. Loesch and Brig. Gen. L. Fred Loesch (USAF). She attended undergraduate school at the University of Southern Mississippi, studying political science, and graduate school at Louisiana State University in New Orleans.

Career
In 1971, Loesch started her entertainment career with television programming and production positions at ABC, then in 1979 with NBC. In 1979 she moved to Hanna-Barbera Productions as vice president for children's programming, moving up to executive vice president. In 1984, she joined Marvel Productions as president and chief executive officer. Loesch also ran Fox Kids from 1990 until 1997. During this time she bought the X-Men TV series and the Power Rangers franchise (both would prove to be wildly popular) for the network. For most of 1998, Loesch was President of the Jim Henson Television Group, where she was involved in the Odyssey Channel agreement with Hallmark Entertainment and National Interfaith Cable Coalition. She moved to Odyssey in November 1998 as president and chief executive officer. With Hallmark taking over a majority ownership in Odyssey, Loesch led a re-branding of Odyssey to the Hallmark Channel in 1999. In 2003, Loesch and Bruce Stein formed The Hatchery, a family entertainment and consumer product company. She was hired as Hub Network CEO position in July 2009 until the end of 2014. In March 2015, Loesch was named to Genius Brands' international board of directors to replace Jeff Weiss, the president and COO of American Greetings.

References

External links

American television producers
American women television producers
Living people
University of New Orleans alumni
American television executives
Women television executives
Fox Broadcasting Company executives
Year of birth missing (living people)
Hanna-Barbera people
University of Southern Mississippi alumni
21st-century American women